Laos, officially the Lao People's Democratic Republic, is a socialist state and the only landlocked country in Southeast Asia. At the heart of the Indochinese Peninsula, Laos is bordered by Myanmar and China to the northwest, Vietnam to the east, Cambodia to the southeast, and Thailand to the west and southwest. Its capital and largest city is Vientiane.

Present-day Laos traces its historic and cultural identity to Lan Xang, which existed from the 13th century to the 18th century as one of the largest kingdoms in Southeast Asia. Because of its central geographical location in Southeast Asia, the kingdom became a hub for overland trade and became wealthy economically and culturally. After a period of internal conflict, Lan Xang broke into three separate kingdoms: Luang Phrabang, Vientiane and Champasak. In 1893, the three territories came under a French protectorate and were united to form what is now known as Laos. It briefly gained independence in 1945 after Japanese occupation but was re-colonised by France until it won autonomy in 1949. Laos became independent in 1953, with a constitutional monarchy under Sisavang Vong. A post-independence civil war began, which saw the communist resistance, supported by the Soviet Union, fight against the monarchy that later came under influence of military regimes supported by the United States. After the Vietnam War ended in 1975, the communist Pathet Lao came to power, ending the civil war. Laos was then dependent on military and economic aid from the Soviet Union until its dissolution in 1991.

Laos is a member of the Asia-Pacific Trade Agreement, the ASEAN, East Asia Summit, and La Francophonie. Laos applied for membership of the World Trade Organization in 1997; on 2 February 2013, it was granted full membership. It is a one-party socialist republic, espousing Marxism–Leninism and governed by the Lao People's Revolutionary Party, under which non-governmental organisations have routinely characterised the country's human rights record as poor, citing repeated abuses such as torture, restrictions on civil liberties and persecution of minorities.

The politically and culturally dominant Lao people make up 53.2% of the population, mostly in the lowlands. Mon-Khmer groups, the Hmong, and other indigenous hill tribes live in the foothills and mountains. Laos's strategies for development are based on generating electricity from rivers and selling the power to its neighbours, namely Thailand, China and Vietnam, as well as its initiative to become a "land-linked" nation, as evidenced by the construction of four new railways connecting Laos and neighbours. Laos has been referred to as one of Southeast Asia and Pacific's fastest growing economies by the World Bank with annual GDP growth averaging 7.4% since 2009.

Etymology
The word Laos was coined by the French, who united the three Lao kingdoms in French Indochina in 1893 and named the country as the plural of the dominant and most common ethnic group, the Lao people. In English, the 's' is pronounced, and not silent. In the Lao language, the country's name is Muang Lao or Pathet Lao, both of which literally mean 'Lao Country'.

History

Prehistory and early history 

An ancient human skull was recovered in 2009 from the Tam Pa Ling Cave in the Annamite Mountains in northern Laos; the skull is at least 46,000 years old, making it the oldest modern human fossil found to date in Southeast Asia. Stone artefacts including Hoabinhian types have been found at sites dating to the Late Pleistocene in northern Laos. Archaeological evidence suggests an agriculturist society developed during the 4th millennium BC. Burial jars and other kinds of sepulchers suggest a complex society in which bronze objects appeared around 1500 BC, and iron tools were known from 700 BC. The proto-historic period is characterised by contact with Chinese and Indian civilisations. According to linguistic and other historical evidence, Tai-speaking tribes migrated southwestward to the modern territories of Laos and Thailand from Guangxi sometime between the 8th and 10th centuries.

Lan Xang 

Laos traces its history to the kingdom of Lan Xang ('million elephants'), which was founded in the 13th century by a Lao prince, Fa Ngum, whose father had his family exiled from the Khmer Empire. Fa Ngum, with 10,000 Khmer troops, conquered many Lao principalities in the Mekong river basin, culminating in the capture of Vientiane. Ngum was descended from a long line of Lao kings that traced back to Khoun Boulom. He made Theravada Buddhism the state religion, and Lan Xang prospered. His ministers, unable to tolerate his ruthlessness, forced him into exile to the present-day Thai province of Nan in 1373, where he died. Fa Ngum's eldest son, Oun Heuan, ascended to the throne under the name Samsenethai and reigned for 43 years. Lan Xang became an important trade centre during Samsenthai's reign, but after his death in 1421 it collapsed into warring factions for nearly a century.

In 1520, Photisarath came to the throne and moved the capital from Luang Prabang to Vientiane to avoid a Burmese invasion. Setthathirath became king in 1548, after his father was killed, and ordered the construction of what became the symbol of Laos, That Luang. Settathirath disappeared in the mountains on his way back from a military expedition into Cambodia, and Lan Xang fell into more than seventy years of instability, involving both Burmese invasion and civil war.

In 1637, when Sourigna Vongsa ascended the throne, Lan Xang further expanded its frontiers. His reign is often regarded as Laos's golden age. When he died without an heir, the kingdom split into three principalities. Between 1763 and 1769, Burmese armies overran northern Laos and annexed Luang Prabang, while Champasak eventually came under Siamese suzerainty.

Chao Anouvong was installed as a vassal king of Vientiane by the Siamese. He encouraged a renaissance of Lao fine arts and literature and improved relations with Luang Phrabang. Under Vietnamese pressure, he rebelled against the Siamese in 1826. The rebellion failed, and Vientiane was ransacked. Anouvong was taken to Bangkok as a prisoner, where he died.

In a time period where the acquisition of humans was a priority over the ownership of land, the warfare of pre-modern Southeast Asia revolved around the seizing of people and resources from its enemies. A Siamese military campaign in Laos in 1876 was described by a British observer as having been "transformed into slave-hunting raids on a large scale".

French Laos (1893–1953) 

In the late 19th century, Luang Prabang was ransacked by the Chinese Black Flag Army. France rescued King Oun Kham and added Luang Phrabang to the protectorate of French Indochina. Shortly after, the Kingdom of Champasak and the territory of Vientiane were added to the protectorate. King Sisavang Vong of Luang Phrabang became ruler of a unified Laos, and Vientiane once again became the capital. Laos never held any importance for France other than as a buffer state between Thailand and the more economically important Annam and Tonkin.

Laos produced tin, rubber, and coffee, but never accounted for more than one percent of French Indochina's exports. By 1940, around 600 French citizens lived in Laos. Under French rule, the Vietnamese were encouraged to migrate to Laos, which was seen by the French colonists as a rational solution to a labour shortage within the confines of an Indochina-wide colonial space. By 1943, the Vietnamese population stood at nearly 40,000, forming the majority in the largest cities of Laos and enjoying the right to elect its own leaders. As a result, 53% of the population of Vientiane, 85% of Thakhek, and 62% of Pakse were Vietnamese, with only the exception of Luang Prabang where the population was predominantly Lao. As late as 1945, the French drew up an ambitious plan to move massive Vietnamese population to three key areas, i.e., the Vientiane Plain, Savannakhet region, and the Bolaven Plateau, which was only derailed by the Japanese invasion of Indochina. Otherwise, according to Martin Stuart-Fox, the Lao might well have lost control over their own country.

During World War II in Laos, Vichy France, Thailand, Imperial Japan and Free France occupied Laos. On 9 March 1945, a nationalist group declared Laos once more independent, with Luang Prabang as its capital, but on 7 April 1945 two battalions of Japanese troops occupied the city. The Japanese attempted to force Sisavang Vong (the King of Luang Phrabang) to declare Laotian independence, but on 8 April he instead simply declared an end to Laos's status as a French protectorate. The king then secretly sent Prince Kindavong to represent Laos to the Allied forces and Prince Sisavang as representative to the Japanese. When Japan surrendered, some Lao nationalists (including Prince Phetsarath) declared Laotian independence, but by early-1946, French troops had reoccupied the country and conferred limited autonomy on Laos.

During the First Indochina War, the Indochinese Communist Party formed the Pathet Lao independence organisation. The Pathet Lao began a war against the French colonial forces with the aid of the Vietnamese independence organisation, the Viet Minh. In 1950, the French were forced to give Laos semi-autonomy as an "associated state" within the French Union. France remained in de facto control until 22 October 1953, when Laos gained full independence as a constitutional monarchy.

Independence and Communist rule (1953–present) 

The First Indochina War took place across French Indochina and eventually led to French defeat and the signing of a peace accord for Laos at the Geneva Conference of 1954. In 1960, amidst a series of rebellions in the Kingdom of Laos, fighting broke out between the Royal Lao Army (RLA) and the communist North Vietnamese and Soviet Union-backed Pathet Lao guerillas. A second Provisional Government of National Unity formed by Prince Souvanna Phouma in 1962 was unsuccessful, and the situation steadily deteriorated into large scale civil war between the Royal Laotian government and the Pathet Lao. The Pathet Lao were backed militarily by the People's Army of Vietnam (PAVN) and the Viet Cong.

Laos was a key part of the Vietnam War since parts of Laos were invaded and occupied by North Vietnam since 1958 for use as a supply route for its war against South Vietnam. In response, the United States initiated a bombing campaign against the PAVN positions, supported regular and irregular anti-communist forces in Laos, and supported Army of the Republic of Vietnam incursions into Laos.

In 1968, the PAVN launched a multi-division attack to help the Pathet Lao fight the RLA. The attack resulted in the RLA largely demobilising, leaving the conflict to irregular ethnic Hmong forces of the "Secret Army" backed by the United States and Thailand, and led by General Vang Pao.

Massive aerial bombardments against the PAVN/Pathet Lao forces were carried out by the United States to prevent the collapse of the Kingdom of Laos central government, and to deny the use of the Ho Chi Minh Trail to attack US forces in South Vietnam. Between 1964 and 1973, the US dropped two million tons of bombs on Laos, nearly equal to the 2.1 million tons of bombs the US dropped on Europe and Asia during all of World War II, making Laos the most heavily bombed country in history relative to the size of its population; The New York Times notes this was "nearly a ton for every person in Laos".

Some 80 million bombs failed to explode and remain scattered throughout the country, rendering vast swaths of land impossible to cultivate. Currently unexploded ordnance (UXO), including cluster munitions and mines, kill or maim approximately 50 Laotians every year. Due to the particularly heavy impact of cluster bombs during this war, Laos was a strong advocate of the Convention on Cluster Munitions to ban the weapons and was host to the First Meeting of States Parties to the convention in November 2010.

In 1975 the Pathet Lao overthrew the royalist government, forcing King Savang Vatthana to abdicate on 2 December 1975. He later died under suspicious circumstances in a re-education camp. Between 20,000 and 62,000 Laotians died during the civil war. The royalists set up a government in exile in the United States.

On 2 December 1975, after taking control of the country, the Pathet Lao government under Kaysone Phomvihane renamed the country as the Lao People's Democratic Republic and signed agreements giving Vietnam the right to station armed forces and to appoint advisers to assist in overseeing the country. The close ties between Laos and Vietnam were formalised via a treaty signed in 1977, which has since provided direction for Lao foreign policy, and provides the basis for Vietnamese involvement at all levels of Lao political and economic life. Laos was requested in 1979 by Vietnam to end relations with the People's Republic of China, leading to isolation in trade by China, the United States, and other countries. In 1979, there were 50,000 PAVN troops stationed in Laos and as many as 6,000 civilian Vietnamese officials including 1,000 directly attached to the ministries in Vientiane.

The conflict between Hmong rebels and Laos continued in key areas of Laos, including in Saysaboune Closed Military Zone, Xaisamboune Closed Military Zone near Vientiane Province and Xiangkhouang Province. From 1975 to 1996, the United States resettled some 250,000 Lao refugees from Thailand, including 130,000 Hmong.

On 3 December 2021, the 422-kilometre Boten-Vientiane railway, a flagship of the Belt and Road Initiative (BRI) was opened.

Geography 

The Mekong River forms a large part of the western boundary with Thailand, where the mountains of the Annamite Range form most of the eastern border with Vietnam and the Luang Prabang Range the northwestern border with the Thai highlands. There are two plateaux, the Xiangkhoang in the north and the Bolaven Plateau at the southern end. Laos can be considered to consist of three geographical areas: north, central, and south. Laos had a 2019 Forest Landscape Integrity Index mean score of 5.59/10, ranking it 98th globally out of 172 countries.

In 1993 the Laos government set aside 21% of the nation's land area for habitat conservation preservation. The country is one of four in the opium poppy growing region known as the "Golden Triangle".

Climate 

The climate is mostly tropical savanna and influenced by the monsoon pattern. There is a distinct rainy season from May to October, followed by a dry season from November to April. Local tradition holds that there are three seasons (rainy, cool and hot) as the latter two months of the climatologically defined dry season are noticeably hotter than the earlier four months.

Administrative divisions 

Laos is divided into 17 provinces (khoueng) and one prefecture (kampheng nakhon), which includes the capital city Vientiane (Nakhon Louang Viangchan). A new province, Xaisomboun province, was established on 13 December 2013. Provinces are further divided into districts (muang) and then villages (ban). An "urban" village is essentially a town.

Government and politics

The Lao PDR is one of the world's few socialist states openly endorsing communism. The only legal political party is the Lao People's Revolutionary Party (LPRP). With one-party state status of Laos, the General Secretary (party leader) holds ultimate power and authority over state and government and serves as the supreme leader.  the head of state is President Thongloun Sisoulith. He has been General Secretary of the Lao People's Revolutionary Party, a position making him the de facto leader of Laos, since January 2021. The incumbent head of government is Prime Minister Sonexay Siphandone. Government policies are determined by the party through the eleven-member Politburo of the Lao People's Revolutionary Party and the 61-member Central Committee of the Lao People's Revolutionary Party.

Laos's first French-written and monarchical constitution was promulgated on 11 May 1947, and declared Laos an independent state within the French Union. The revised constitution of 11 May 1957 omitted reference to the French Union, though close educational, health and technical ties with the former colonial power persisted. The 1957 document was abrogated in December 1975, when a communist people's republic was proclaimed. A new constitution was adopted in 1991 and enshrined a "leading role" for the LPRP.

Foreign relations

The foreign relations of Laos after the takeover by the Pathet Lao in December 1975 were characterised by a hostile posture toward the West, with the government of the Lao PDR aligning itself with the Soviet Bloc, maintaining close ties with the Soviet Union and depending heavily on the Soviets for most of its foreign assistance. Laos also maintained a "special relationship" with Vietnam and formalised a 1977 treaty of friendship and cooperation that created tensions with China.

Laos's emergence from international isolation has been marked through improved and expanded relations with other countries including Russia, China, Thailand, Australia, Germany, Italy, Japan and Switzerland. Trade relations with the United States were normalised in November 2004 through Congress approved legislation. Laos was admitted into the Association of Southeast Asian Nations (ASEAN) in July 1997 and acceded to the World Trade Organization in 2016. In 2005 it attended the inaugural East Asia Summit.

Military

On 17 May 2014, Defence Minister and Deputy Prime Minister Douangchay Phichit was killed in a plane crash, along with other top ranking officials. The officials were to participate in a ceremony to mark the liberation of the Plain of Jars from the former Royal Lao government forces. Their Russian-built Antonov AN 74-300 with 20 people on board crashed in Xiangkhouang Province.

Hmong conflict
Some Hmong groups fought as CIA-backed units on the royalist side in the Laotian Civil War. After the Pathet Lao took over the country in 1975, the conflict continued in isolated pockets. In 1977, a communist newspaper promised the party would hunt down the "American collaborators" and their families "to the last root". As many as 200,000 Hmong went into exile in Thailand, with many ending up in the US. Other Hmong fighters hid out in mountains in Xiangkhouang Province for many years, with a remnant emerging from the jungle in 2003.

In 1989, the United Nations High Commissioner for Refugees (UNHCR), with the support of the US government, instituted the Comprehensive Plan of Action, a programme to stem the tide of Indochinese refugees from Laos, Vietnam, and Cambodia. Under the plan, refugee status was evaluated through a screening process. Recognised asylum seekers were given resettlement opportunities, while the remaining refugees were to be repatriated under guarantee of safety. After talks with the UNHCR and the Thai government, Laos agreed to repatriate the 60,000 Lao refugees living in Thailand, including several thousand Hmong people. Very few of the Lao refugees, however, were willing to return voluntarily. Pressure to resettle the refugees grew as the Thai government worked to close its remaining refugee camps. While some Hmong people returned to Laos voluntarily, with development assistance from UNHCR, allegations of forced repatriation surfaced. Of those Hmong who did return to Laos, some quickly escaped back to Thailand, describing discrimination and brutal treatment at the hands of Lao authorities.

In 1993, Vue Mai, a former Hmong soldier and leader of the largest Hmong refugee camp in Thailand, who had been recruited by the US Embassy in Bangkok to return to Laos as proof of the repatriation programme's success, disappeared in Vientiane. According to the US Committee for Refugees, he was arrested by Lao security forces and was never seen again. Following the Vue Mai incident, debate over the Hmong's planned repatriation to Laos intensified greatly, especially in the United States, where it drew strong opposition from many American conservatives and some human rights advocates. In a 23 October 1995 National Review article, Michael Johns, the former Heritage Foundation foreign policy expert and Republican White House aide, labelled the Hmong's repatriation a Clinton administration "betrayal", describing the Hmong as a people "who have spilled their blood in defense of American geopolitical interests". Debate on the issue escalated quickly. In an effort to halt the planned repatriation, the Republican-led US Senate and House of Representatives both appropriated funds for the remaining Thailand-based Hmong to be immediately resettled in the United States; Clinton, however, responded by promising a veto of the legislation.

In their opposition of the repatriation plans, Democratic and Republican Members of Congress challenged the Clinton administration's position that the government of Laos was not systematically violating Hmong human rights. US Representative Steve Gunderson, for instance, told a Hmong gathering: "I do not enjoy standing up and saying to my government that you are not telling the truth, but if that is necessary to defend truth and justice, I will do that." Republicans called several Congressional hearings on alleged persecution of the Hmong in Laos in an apparent attempt to generate further support for their opposition to the Hmong's repatriation to Laos.

Although some accusations of forced repatriation were denied, thousands of Hmong people refused to return to Laos. In 1996 as the deadline for the closure of Thai refugee camps approached, and under mounting political pressure, the United States agreed to resettle Hmong refugees who passed a new screening process. Around 5,000 Hmong people who were not resettled at the time of the camp closures sought asylum at Wat Tham Krabok, a Buddhist monastery in central Thailand where more than 10,000 Hmong refugees had already been living. The Thai government attempted to repatriate these refugees, but the Wat Tham Krabok Hmong refused to leave and the Lao government refused to accept them, claiming they were involved in the illegal drug trade and were of non-Lao origin. Following threats of forcible removal by the Thai government, the United States, in a significant victory for the Hmong, agreed to accept 15,000 of the refugees in 2003. Several thousand Hmong people, fearing forced repatriation to Laos if they were not accepted for resettlement in the United States, fled the camp to live elsewhere within Thailand where a sizeable Hmong population has been present since the 19th century. In 2004 and 2005, thousands of Hmong fled from the jungles of Laos to a temporary refugee camp in the Thai province of Phetchabun.

Lending further support to earlier claims that the government of Laos was persecuting the Hmong, filmmaker Rebecca Sommer documented first-hand accounts in her documentary, Hunted Like Animals, and in a comprehensive report that includes summaries of refugee claims and was submitted to the UN in May 2006.

The European Union, UNHCHR, and international groups have since spoken out about the forced repatriation. The Thai foreign ministry has said that it will halt deportation of Hmong refugees held in Detention Centres in Nong Khai, while talks are underway to resettle them in Australia, Canada, the Netherlands and the United States. Plans to resettle additional Hmong refugees in the United States were stalled by provisions of President George W. Bush's Patriot Act and Real ID Act, under which Hmong veterans of the Secret War, who fought on the side of the United States, are classified as terrorists because of their historical involvement in armed conflict.

Human rights

Human rights violations remain a significant concern in Laos. In The Economist's Democracy Index 2016 Laos was classified as an "authoritarian regime", ranking lowest of the nine ASEAN nations included in the study. Prominent civil society advocates, human rights defenders, political and religious dissidents, and Hmong refugees have disappeared at the hands of Lao military and security forces.

Ostensibly, the Constitution of Laos that was promulgated in 1991 and amended in 2003 contains most key safeguards for human rights. For example, Article 8 makes it clear that Laos is a multinational state and is committed to equality between ethnic groups. The constitution also contains provisions for gender equality, freedom of religion, freedom of speech, and freedom of press and assembly. On 25 September 2009, Laos ratified the International Covenant on Civil and Political Rights, nine years after signing the treaty. The stated policy objectives of both the Lao government and international donors remain focused upon achieving sustainable economic growth and poverty reduction.

However, the government of Laos frequently breaches its own constitution and the rule of law, since the judiciary and judges are appointed by the ruling communist party. According to independent non-profit/non-governmental organisations (NGOs) such as Amnesty International, Human Rights Watch, and Civil Rights Defenders, along with the US State Department, serious human rights violations such as arbitrary detentions, disappearances, free speech restrictions, prison abuses and other violations are an ongoing problem. Amnesty International raised concerns about the ratification record of the Lao government on human rights standards and its lack of co-operation with the UN human rights mechanisms and legislative measures—both impact negatively upon human rights. The organisation also raised concerns in relation to freedom of expression, poor prison conditions, restrictions on freedom of religions, protection of refugees and asylum-seekers, and the death penalty.

In October 1999, 30 young people were arrested for attempting to display posters calling for peaceful economic, political and social change in Laos. Five of them were arrested and subsequently sentenced to up to 10 years imprisonment on charges of treason. They were to have been released by October 2009, but their whereabouts remain unknown. Later reports have contradicted this, claiming they were sentenced to 20 years in prison. In late February 2017, two of those imprisoned were finally released after 17 years.

Laos and Vietnamese (SRV) troops were reported to have raped and killed four Christian Hmong women in Xiangkhouang Province in 2011, according to the US-based non-governmental public policy research organisation The Centre for Public Policy Analysis, which also said other Christian and independent Buddhist and animist believers were being persecuted.

Human rights advocates including Vang Pobzeb, Kerry and Kay Danes, and others have also raised concerns about human rights violations, torture, the arrest and detention of political prisoners as well as the detention of foreign prisoners in Laos including at the infamous Phonthong Prison in Vientiane.

According to estimates, around 300,000 people fled to Thailand as a consequence of governmental repressions. Amongst them, 100,000 Hmongs—30% of the entire Hmong population—and 90% of all of Lao intellectuals, specialists, and officials. Moreover, 130,000 deaths can be attributed to the civil war. Laos is an origin country for sexually trafficked persons.  A number of citizens, primarily women and girls from all ethnic groups and foreigners, have been victims of sex trafficking in Laos.

Economy 

The Lao economy depends on investment and trade with its neighbours, Thailand, Vietnam, and, especially in the north, China. Pakxe has also experienced growth based on cross-border trade with Thailand and Vietnam. In 2009, despite the fact that the government is still officially communist, the Obama administration in the US declared Laos was no longer a Marxist–Leninist state and lifted bans on Laotian companies receiving financing from the US Export-Import Bank.

In 2016, China was the biggest foreign investor in Laos's economy, having invested in US$5.395 billion since 1989, according to Laos Ministry of Planning and Investment's 1989–2014 report. Thailand (invested US$4.489 billion) and Vietnam (invested US$3.108 billion) are the second and third largest investors respectively. The economy receives development aid from the International Monetary Fund, Asian Development Bank, and other international sources; and also foreign direct investment for development of the society, industry, hydropower and mining (most notably of copper and gold).

Subsistence agriculture still accounts for half of the GDP and provides 80% of employment. Only 4% of the country is arable land and a mere 0.3% used as permanent crop land, the lowest percentage in the Greater Mekong Subregion. The irrigated areas under cultivation account for only 28% of the total area under cultivation which, in turn, represents only 12% of all of the agricultural land in 2012. Rice dominates agriculture, with about 80% of the arable land area used for growing rice. Approximately 77% of Lao farm households are self-sufficient in rice. Laos may have the greatest number of rice varieties in the Greater Mekong Subregion. The Lao government has been working with the International Rice Research Institute of the Philippines to collect seed samples of each of the thousands of rice varieties found in Laos.

Laos is rich in mineral resources and imports petroleum and gas. Metallurgy is an important industry, and the government hopes to attract foreign investment to develop the substantial deposits of coal, gold, bauxite, tin, copper, and other valuable metals. The mining industry of Laos has received prominent attention with foreign direct investments. This sector has made significant contributions to the economic condition of Laos. More than 540 mineral deposits of gold, copper, zinc, lead and other minerals have been identified, explored and mined. In addition, the country's plentiful water resources and mountainous terrain enable it to produce and export large quantities of hydroelectric energy. Of the potential capacity of approximately 18,000 megawatts, around 8,000 megawatts have been committed for export to Thailand and Vietnam. As of 2021, despite cheap hydro power available in the country, Laos continues to also rely on fossil fuels, coal in particular, in the domestic electricity production.

In 2018, the country ranked 139th on the Human Development Index (HDI), indicating medium development. According to the Global Hunger Index (2018), Laos ranks as the 36th hungriest nation in the world out of the list of the 52 nations with the worst hunger situation(s). In 2019, the UN Special Rapporteur on extreme poverty and human rights conducted an official visit to Laos and found that the country's top-down approach to economic growth and poverty alleviation "is all too often counterproductive, leading to impoverishment and jeopardising the rights of the poor and marginalised."

The country's most widely recognised product may well be Beerlao, which in 2017 was exported to more than 20 countries worldwide. It is produced by the Lao Brewery Company.

Tourism 

The tourism sector has grown rapidly, from 80,000 international visitors in 1990, to 1.876 million in 2010, when tourism had been expected to rise to US$1.5857 billion by 2020. In 2010, one in every 11 jobs was in the tourism sector. Export earnings from international visitors and tourism goods are expected to generate 16% of total exports or US$270.3 million in 2010, growing in nominal terms to US$484.2 million (12.5% of the total) in 2020. The European Council on Trade and Tourism awarded the country the "World Best Tourist Destination" designation for 2013 for architecture and history.

Luang Prabang and Vat Phou are both UNESCO World Heritage sites. Major festivals include Lao New Year celebrated around 13–15 April and involves a water festival similar but more subdued than that of Thailand and other Southeast Asian countries.

The Lao National Tourism Administration, related government agencies and the private sector are working together to realise the vision put forth in the country's National Ecotourism Strategy and Action Plan. This includes decreasing the environmental and cultural impact of tourism; increasing awareness in the importance of ethnic groups and biological diversity; providing a source of income to conserve, sustain and manage the Lao protected area network and cultural heritage sites; and emphasizing the need for tourism zoning and management plans for sites that will be developed as ecotourism destinations.

Infrastructure 

The main international airports are Vientiane's Wattay International Airport and Luang Prabang International Airport with Pakse International Airport also having a few international flights. The national carrier is Lao Airlines. Other carriers serving the country include Bangkok Airways, Vietnam Airlines, AirAsia, Thai Airways and China Eastern Airlines.

The mountainous geography of Laos had impeded Laos's ground transportation development throughout the 20th century. Its first railway line, a short 3-km long metre-gauge railway that connects southern Vientiane to Thailand, only opened in 2009. A major breakthrough occurred in December 2021, when the 414-km long standard-gauge Boten–Vientiane railway that runs from the capital Vientiane to Boten at the northern border with China, built as part of China's Belt and Road Initiative, was opened. Two new lines connecting with Vietnam, namely the Vientiane–Vũng Áng and Savannakhet–Lao Bao railways, are also under planning, in line to meet the Laotian government's vision of becoming a land-linked nation.

The major roads connecting to urban centres, in particular Route 13, have been significantly upgraded in recent years. Laos's first expressway, the Vientiane–Boten Expressway, parallels both Route 13 and the Boten–Vientiane railway; the first section from Vientiane to Vang Vieng was opened in 2020, with other sections under construction. However, villages far from major roads can be reached only through unpaved roads that may not be accessible year-round.

There is limited external and internal telecommunication, but mobile phones have become widespread. Ninety-three percent of households have a telephone, either fixed line or mobile. Electricity is available to 93% of the population. Songthaews are used in the country for long-distance and local public transport.

Water supply 

According to the World Bank data conducted in 2014, Laos has met the Millennium Development Goal (MDG) targets on water and sanitation regarding the UNICEF/WHO Joint Monitoring Programme. However, as of 2018, there are approximately 1.9 million of Lao's population who could not access an improved water supply and 2.4 million people without access to improved sanitation.

Laos has made particularly noteworthy progress increasing access to sanitation. Laos's predominantly rural population makes investing in sanitation difficult. In 1990 only 8% of the rural population had access to improved sanitation. Access rose rapidly from 10 percent in 1995 to 38 percent in 2008. Between 1995 and 2008 approximately 1,232,900 more people had access to improved sanitation in rural areas. Laos's progress is notable in comparison to similar developing countries. The authorities in Laos have recently developed an innovative regulatory framework for public–private partnership contracts signed with small enterprises, in parallel with more conventional regulation of state-owned water enterprises.

Demographics 

The term "Laotian" does not necessarily refer to the Lao language, ethnic Lao people, language or customs. It is a political term that includes the non-ethnic Lao groups within Laos and identifies them as "Laotian" because of their political citizenship. Laos has the youngest population of any country in Asia with a median age of 21.6 years.

Laos's population was estimated at 7.45 million in 2020, dispersed unevenly across the country. Most people live in valleys of the Mekong River and its tributaries. Vientiane prefecture, the capital and largest city, had about 683,000 residents in 2020.

Ethnicity 
The people of Laos are often categorised by their distribution by elevation: (lowlands, midlands and upper high lands) as this somewhat correlates with ethnic groupings. More than half of the nation's population is ethnic Lao—the principal lowland inhabitants, and the politically and culturally dominant people of Laos. The Lao belong to the Tai linguistic group who began migrating south from China in the first millennium CE. Ten percent belong to other "lowland" groups, which together with the Lao people make up the Lao Loum (lowland people).

In the central and southern mountains, Mon-Khmer-speaking groups, known as Lao Theung or mid-slope Laotians, predominate. Other terms are Khmu, Khamu (Kammu) or Kha as the Lao Loum refer to them to indicate their Austroasiatic language affiliation. However, the latter is considered pejorative, meaning 'slave'. They were the indigenous inhabitants of northern Laos. Some Vietnamese, Laotian Chinese and Thai minorities remain, particularly in the towns, but many left after independence in the late 1940s, many of whom relocated either to Vietnam, Hong Kong, or to France. Lao Theung constitute about 30% of the population.

Hill people and minority cultures of Laos such as the Hmong, Yao (Mien) (Hmong-Mien), Dao, Shan, and several Tibeto-Burman speaking peoples have lived in isolated regions of Laos for many years. Mountain/hill tribes of mixed ethno/cultural-linguistic heritage are found in northern Laos, which include the Lua and Khmu people who are indigenous to Laos. Collectively, they are known as Lao Soung or highland Laotians. Lao Soung account for about 10% of the population.

Languages 
The official and majority language is Lao, a language of the Tai-Kadai language family. However, only slightly more than half of the population speaks Lao natively. The remainder, particularly in rural areas, speak ethnic minority languages. The Lao alphabet, which evolved sometime between the 13th and 14th centuries, was derived from the ancient Khmer script and is very similar to Thai script. Languages like Khmu (Austroasiatic) and Hmong (Hmong-Mien) are spoken by minorities, particularly in the midland and highland areas. A number of Laotian sign languages are used in areas with high rates of congenital deafness.

French is used in government and commerce, and Laos is a member of the French-speaking organisation of La Francophonie. The organisation estimated in 2010 that there were 173,800 French speakers in Laos.
The French language's decline was slower and occurred later in Laos than in Vietnam and Cambodia, as the monarchy of Laos had close political relations with France. At the eve of the Vietnam War, the Secret War was beginning in Laos as political factions between communist Pathet Lao and the government occurred. Pathet Lao held areas used Lao as their sole language and following the end of the Vietnam War, French began its sharp decline in Laos. Additionally, many elite and French-educated Lao immigrated to nations such as the United States and France to escape government persecution. With the end of isolationism in the early 1990s however, the French language rebounded, thanks to the establishment of French, Swiss and Canadian relations and opening of French-language centers in central Laos. Today, French has a healthier status in Laos than the other Francophone nations of Asia and about 35% of all students in Laos receive their education in French, with the language being a required course in many schools. French is also used in public works in central and southern Laos and Luang Prabang and is a language of diplomacy and of the elite classes, higher professions and elders. 

English, the language of the Association of Southeast Asian Nations (ASEAN), has become increasingly studied in recent years.

Religion 

Sixty-six percent of Laotians were Theravada Buddhist, 1.5 percent Christian, 0.1 percent Muslim, 0.1 percent Jewish, and 32.3 percent were other or traditional (mostly practitioners of Satsana Phi) in 2010. Buddhism has long been one of the most important social forces in Laos. Theravada Buddhism has coexisted peacefully since its introduction to the country with the local polytheism.

Health 

Male life expectancy at birth was at 62.6 years and female life expectancy was at 66.7 years in 2017. Healthy life expectancy was 54 years in 2007. Government expenditure on health is about four percent of GDP, about US$18 (PPP) in 2006.

Education 

The adult literacy rate for women in 2017 was 62.9%; for adult men, 78.1%.

In 2004 the net primary enrollment rate was 84%. The National University of Laos is the Lao state's public university. As a low-income country, Laos faces a brain-drain problem as many educated people migrate to developed countries. It is estimated that about 37% of educated Laotians live outside Laos. Laos was ranked 117th in the Global Innovation Index in 2021 down from 113rd in 2020.

Culture 

Theravada Buddhism is a dominant influence in Lao culture. It is evident throughout the country, expressed in language, temples and the arts and literature. Many elements of Lao culture predate Buddhism. For example, Laotian music is dominated by its national musical instrument, the khaen, a type of bamboo mouth organ that has prehistoric origins. The khaen traditionally accompanied the singer in mor lam, the dominant style of folk music.

Sticky rice is a staple food and has cultural and religious significance to the Lao people. Sticky rice is generally preferred over jasmine rice, and sticky rice cultivation and production is thought to have originated in Laos. There are many traditions and rituals associated with rice production in different environments and among many ethnic groups. For example, Khammu farmers in Luang Prabang plant the rice variety khao kam in small quantities near the farm house in memory of dead parents, or at the edge of the rice field to indicate that parents are still alive.

The sinh is a traditional garment worn by Lao women in daily life. It is a hand-woven silk skirt that can identify the woman who wears it in a variety of ways.

Cinema 

Since the founding of the Lao PDR in 1975, very few films have been made in Laos. The first feature-length film made after the monarchy was abolished is Gun Voice from the Plain of Jars, directed by Somchith Pholsena in 1983, although its release was prevented by a censorship board. One of the first commercial feature-length films was Sabaidee Luang Prabang, made in 2008. The 2017 documentary feature film Blood Road was predominantly shot and produced in Laos with assistance from the Lao government, it was recognised with a News and Documentary Emmy Award in 2018.

Australian filmmaker Kim Mordount's first feature film was made in Laos and features a Laotian cast speaking their native language. Entitled The Rocket, the film appeared at the 2013 Melbourne International Film Festival and won three awards at the Berlin International Film Festival. One production company's film that has succeeded to produce Lao feature films and gain international recognition is Lao New Wave Cinema's At the Horizon, directed by Anysay Keola, that was screened at the OzAsia Film Festival and Lao Art Media's Chanthaly (Lao: ຈັນທະລີ) directed by Mattie Do, which was screened at the 2013 Fantastic Fest. In September 2017, Laos submitted Dearest Sister (Lao: ນ້ອງຮັກ), Mattie Do's second feature film, to the 90th Academy Awards (or the Oscars) for consideration for Best Foreign Language Film, marking the country's first submission for the Oscars.

As of 2018, Laos has three theatres dedicated to showing films.

Festivals 
There are some public holidays, festivities and ceremonies in Laos.
Hmong New Year (Nopejao)
Bun Pha Wet
Magha Puja
Chinese New Year
Boun Khoun Khao
Boun Pimai
Visakha Puja
Pi Mai/Songkran(Lao New Year)
Khao Phansaa
Haw Khao Padap Din
Awk Phansaa
Bun Nam
Lao National Day (2 December)

Media 
All newspapers are published by the government, including two foreign language papers: the English-language daily Vientiane Times and the French-language weekly Le Rénovateur. Additionally, the Khao San Pathet Lao, the country's official news agency, publishes English and French versions of its eponymous paper. Laos has nine daily newspapers, 90 magazines, 43 radio stations, and 32 TV stations operating throughout the country. , Nhân Dân ('The People') and the Xinhua News Agency are the only foreign media organisations permitted to open offices in Laos—both opened bureaus in Vientiane in 2011.

The Lao government controls all media channels to prevent critique of its actions. Lao citizens who have criticised the government have been subjected to enforced disappearances, arbitrary arrests and torture.

Polygamy 
Polygamy is officially a crime in Laos, though the penalty is minor. The constitution and Family Code bar the legal recognition of polygamous marriages, stipulating that monogamy is the principal form of marriage in the country. Polygamy, however, is still customary among some Hmong people. Only 3.5% of women and 2.1% of men between the ages of 15–49 were in a polygamous union as of 2017.

Sport 

The martial art of muay Lao, the national sport, is a form of kickboxing similar to Thailand's muay Thai, Burmese Lethwei and Cambodian Pradal Serey.

Association football is the most popular sport in Laos. Its national football team is a member of the Asian Football Confederation and of the ASEAN Football Federation. It has failed to qualify for the FIFA World Cup or the AFC Asian Cup, but has participated in minor competitions like the AFC Solidarity Cup and the AFF Championship. The Lao League is the top professional league for association football clubs in the country. Since the start of the league, Lao Army F.C. has been the most successful club with 8 titles, the highest number of championship wins.

Laos has no tradition in other team sports. In 2017, the country sent a team for the first time to the team events at the Southeast Asian Games. The national basketball team competed at the 2017 Southeast Asian Games where it beat Myanmar in the eighth place game.

See also 

Drug policy in Laos
Laos Memorial
Outline of Laos
Energy in Laos

Notes

References

External links 

Chief of State and Cabinet Members 
Country Profile at BBC News

 
1949 establishments in Laos
Communist states
Countries in Asia
French-speaking countries and territories
Landlocked countries
Least developed countries
Member states of ASEAN
Member states of the Organisation internationale de la Francophonie
Member states of the United Nations
Republics
Southeast Asian countries
States and territories established in 1949
One-party states